Orthonevra bellula  (Williston, 1882), the Three-lined Mucksucker, is a rare species of syrphid fly found in the Southern California Hoverflies get their names from the ability to remain nearly motionless while in flight The  adults are also  known as flower flies for they are commonly found around and on flowers from which they get both energy-giving nectar and protein-rich pollen. Larvae for this genus are of the rat-tailed type. O. bellula larvae have not been described.

References

Eristalinae
Articles created by Qbugbot
Insects described in 1882
Taxa named by Samuel Wendell Williston